Vosloorus is a large township situated south of Boksburg and just east of Katlehong in Ekurhuleni, just 30 kilometres south-east of Johannesburg, Gauteng, South Africa. It was established in 1963 when Black Africans were removed from Stirtonville because it was considered by the government too close to a white town. Stirtonville, renamed Reiger Park, has since become home to Boksburg's coloured community. A local authority was established in 1983 when Vosloorus was given full municipal status.

Notable residents
  Sol Phenduka  - Podcaster , Radio Jock , Tv Presenter, DJ,Music Producer, Reality tv star 
 Boohle - Amapiano singer-songwriter
 De Mthuda - Record producer & DJ
 DJ Cleo - House music producer, DJ and recording artist
 Moses Sithole - Serial killer & rapist
 David Tlale - Fashion designer
Fortune Makaringe- Soccer player
Emelda "Sista H" - stand comedian and YouTube sensation
Alfred Ntombela- Actor
DJ Clock - Dj & Producer
Bekzin Terris - Dj & Producer
Kwiish SA

References

Townships in Gauteng
Populated places in Ekurhuleni
Populated places established in 1963